Eucalyptus globulus subsp. globulus, commonly known as  the Tasmanian blue gum, southern blue gum, or blue gum, is a subspecies of tree that is endemic to southeastern Australia. It has mostly smooth bark with some persistent slabs of old bark at the base, juvenile leaves with one glaucous side, glossy, lance-shaped adult leaves, warty flower buds arranged singly in leaf axils, white flowers and hemispherical to conical fruit that is more or less square in cross-section.

Description
The bark is mostly smooth, shedding in long strips to leave a white or greyish surface. There is sometimes rough, partially shed bark at the base of the trunk and ribbons of shedding bark in the upper branches. Young plants and coppice regrowth have stems that are more or less square in cross-section, with a prominent wing on each corner.

Flowering occurs between May and January and the flowers are white.

Taxonomy and naming
Tasmanian blue gum was first formally described in 1800 by Jacques Labillardière in his book, Relation du Voyage à la Recherche de la Pérouse. In 1974, James Barrie Kirkpatrick described four subspecies of E. globulus and E. globulus subsp. globulus became the autonym.

Distribution and habitat
This blue gum grows in woodland and forest in moist valleys in Victoria and Tasmania, including on Flinders and King Islands. It is common in lowland areas of Tasmania but is only found in the far south of Victoria, including in places like Port Franklin and Wilsons Promontory.

Tallest specimens
In 2021 an 80 metre tall specimen, regarded as being the largest known remaining Tasmanian blue gum and estimated as being 500 years old, was discovered in the Huon Valley, in a coup originally slated for logging in 2023. This tree, named "Lathamus Keep" by conservationists, is likely to be protected as a recognised giant tree by Sustainable Timber Tasmania, but conservationists are still concerned over its future.

References 

globulus
Myrtales of Australia
Flora of Tasmania
Flora of Victoria (Australia)
Plants described in 1800
Taxa named by Jacques Labillardière